No Reservations is a 2007 American romantic comedy-drama film directed by Scott Hicks and starring Catherine Zeta-Jones, Aaron Eckhart, and Abigail Breslin. The screenplay by Carol Fuchs is an adaptation of an original script by Sandra Nettelbeck, which served as the basis for the 2001 German film Mostly Martha, and revolves around a hard-edged chef whose life is turned upside down when she decides to take in her young niece following a tragic accident that killed her sister. Patricia Clarkson, Bob Balaban, and Jenny Wade co-star, with Brían F. O'Byrne, Lily Rabe, and Zoë Kravitz—appearing in her first feature film—playing supporting roles.

The film received a mixed reception by critics, who found it "predictable and too melancholy for the genre", resulting in a 42% overall approval rating from Rotten Tomatoes. Upon its opening release on July 27, 2007, in the United States and Canada, No Reservations became a moderate commercial success: The film grossed $12 million in its opening weekend, eventually grossing over $43 million at the domestic box-office and over $92 million worldwide. Breslin was nominated for a Young Artist Award for her performance.

Plot
Kate Armstrong is the head chef at the trendy 22 Bleecker Street Restaurant in Manhattan’s West Village. She runs her kitchen at a rapid pace as she coordinates the making and preparation of all the fantastic meals, and personally displays the food to perfection on every dish.

Kate intimidates everyone around her, including her boss Paula, who sends her to therapy. She hates to leave the kitchen when a customer wants to compliment her on one of her special dishes; however, she shoots out of the kitchen in an instant when a customer insults her cooking.

When Kate's sister Christine is killed in a car accident, her nine-year-old niece, Zoe, must move in with her. Kate is devastated by her sister's death and with all of her problems, Paula decides to hire a new sous chef to join the staff, Nick Palmer, who is a rising star in his own right and could be the head chef of any restaurant he pleased. Nick, however, wants to work under Kate.

The atmosphere in the kitchen is somewhat chaotic as Kate feels increasingly threatened by Nick as time goes on due to his style of running her kitchen. He loves to listen to opera while he cooks and also make the staff laugh. Kate also finds herself strangely attracted to Nick, whose uplifting personality has not only affected her staff but Zoe as well, who has been coming to work with her and bonded with him.

With all that is happening in Kate's life, the last thing she would want is to fall in love with this man, as she has pushed away all others prior. Nevertheless, there is chemistry between them that only flourishes with their passion for cooking. Yet life hits her hard when Paula offers Nick the job of head chef, rather than Kate.

In the end, Kate allows herself to become vulnerable and tear down the walls she has built throughout her life so that she and Nick could start fresh. The movie concludes with Zoe, Nick, and Kate having opened their own bistro.

Cast
Catherine Zeta-Jones as Kate Armstrong
Aaron Eckhart as Nicholas "Nick" Palmer
Abigail Breslin as Zoe
Patricia Clarkson as Paula
Jenny Wade as Leah Scott
Bob Balaban as Therapist
Brían F. O'Byrne as Sean Paul
Lily Rabe as Bernadette Ezkeniazki
Arija Bareikis as Kate's sister (Christine) 
John McMartin as Mr. Peterson
Celia Weston as Mrs. Peterson
Zoë Kravitz as Charlotte do Buchanan Straniazki
Dearbhla Molloy as Anna Petersova Rasha
Matt Servitto as Doctor Foop
Fulvio Cecere as Bob Dylan

Production
The film was scored by Philip Glass, who also appears in the final bistro scenes.  The film soundtrack makes extensive use of operatic music, and includes Liz Phair's song "Count On My Love". Filming took place in New York in 2006-7.

Reception

Critical reception
Rotten Tomatoes, an aggregator of reviews from published critics, showed that 42% of them reviewed it favorably based on 162 reviews, with an average rating of 5.25/10. The site's critics consensus reads, "This romantic comedy may look good on paper, but it's too predictable and melancholy for the genre." On Metacritic, the film has a weighted average score of 50 out of 100 based on 33 critics, indicating "mixed or average reviews".

Matt Zoller Seitz of The New York Times said, "What's unexpected and gratifying ... is the film's enlightened attitude toward parenthood and work, which the movie's publicity campaign conspicuously glosses over, even though it's the story's driving force ... Make no mistake: No Reservations is a factory-sealed romantic comedy ... But the emotional details of Kate, Nick and Zoe's journey are surprising, honest and life-size, and the film's determination to present their predicament sympathetically, without appealing to retrograde ideals of femininity and motherhood, makes it notable, and in some ways unique." Roger Ebert of the Chicago Sun-Times stated, "The movie is focused on two kinds of chemistry: of the kitchen, and of the heart. The kitchen works better, with shots of luscious-looking food, arranged like organic still lifes. But chemistry among Nick, Kate and Zoe is curiously lacking, except when we sense some fondness—not really love—between Zoe and her potential new dad ... the characters seem to feel more passion for food than for each other." Carina Chocano of the Los Angeles Times called the film "one of those movies that presents life precisely and meticulously as it isn't, presumably as some kind of consolation for how it really is" and added, "With its simplistic compartmentalization of dueling personality types, kindergarten view of grown-up love, exquisite styling, overripe camera moves and lousy, overwrought score, the movie feels stubbornly, resolutely disingenuous and one-dimensional. Everything in it is designed to make you feel better, so why does it feel artificial and palliative in that really depressing way?" Todd McCarthy of Variety observed, "Agreeably prepared and attractively presented, this remake of the tasty 2001 German feature Mostly Martha bears too many earmarks of Hollywood packaging and emotional button-pushing, but doesn't go far wrong by closely sticking to the original's smart story construction ... Scott Hicks' work cuts both ways, creating a warm cocoon that fosters engagement with the well-drawn characters while at the same time steering the material in softer-than-necessary directions and refraining from peeking any deeper into the main characters to suggest what makes them tick. Without question, Ratatouille deals more profoundly with the personality makeup and urges of a driven chef-as-artist than does this genial divertissement."

Box office
No Reservations was released in 2,425 theaters in the US on July 27, 2007, and earned $11,704,357 and ranked fifth on its opening weekend. The film eventually grossed $43,107,979 in the US and $49,493,071 in foreign markets for a total worldwide box office of $92,601,050.

Awards and nominations
Abigail Breslin was nominated for the Young Artist Award for Best Performance in a Feature Film by a Leading Young Actress for her performance as Zoe.

See also
List of American films of 2007
Mostly Martha

References

External links

2007 romantic comedy-drama films
2007 films
American remakes of German films
American romantic comedy-drama films
Castle Rock Entertainment films
Cooking films
Films scored by Philip Glass
Films about chefs
Films about families
Films about grieving
Films directed by Scott Hicks
Films set in Manhattan
Films set in restaurants
Village Roadshow Pictures films
Warner Bros. films
2007 comedy films
2007 drama films
2000s English-language films
2000s American films